Sy Rosen is an American producer and screenwriter. He served as one of the creators of the American sitcom television series Gimme a Break!, which he created with Mort Lachman.

Career 
Rosen started his career in 1976, first writing a few episodes for the television series The Bob Newhart Show. He also served in the army and graduated from college, in 1969.

In 1980s-2000s, Rosen produced and wrote many shows, including, Taxi, The Wonder Years, Maude, M*A*S*H, The Jeffersons, Rhoda, Sister, Sister, Throb, My Two Dads and Sanford. In 1987, he created the new NBC sitcom television series Roomies, which ran for 8 episodes.

In 2007, Rosen wrote the book The Miracle Group.

In 2018, Rosen screenplayed the short film The Matchmaker, which starred Barbara Bain, Rhea Perlman, Robert Romanus and Bryna Weiss. He explained that the short film was about an man who tries to find his mother a friend in her nursing home, which had also happened to Rosen.

References

External links 

Living people
Year of birth missing (living people)
American television writers
American male television writers
American television producers
American male screenwriters
American screenwriters
American producers
20th-century American male writers
20th-century American screenwriters
21st-century American male writers
21st-century American screenwriters
Showrunners